Burwood North railway station is a proposed station on the Sydney Metro West that will serve the Sydney suburb of Burwood. It will be located on the corner of Burwood and Parramatta Roads and is scheduled to open with the rest of the line by 2030.

References

External links
Burwood North Metro station Sydney Metro

Burwood, New South Wales

Proposed Sydney Metro stations
Railway stations scheduled to open in 2030